Kamenno-Verkhovka is a rural locality (a selo) and the administrative center of Kamenno-Verkhovskoye Rural Settlement, Kashirsky District, Voronezh Oblast, Russia. The population was 437 as of 2018. There are 18 streets.

Geography 
Kamenno-Verkhovka is located 46 km west of Kashirskoye (the district's administrative centre) by road. Borshchevo is the nearest rural locality.

References 

Rural localities in Kashirsky District, Voronezh Oblast
Korotoyaksky Uyezd